MUHS is a four-letter acronym, and may refer to:

Marquette University High School, Milwaukee, Wisconsin, United States
Maharashtra University of Health Sciences, Nashik, India
Middlebury Union High School, Middlebury, Vermont, United States